Grant Williams (born 22 July 1996) is a South African rugby union player currently playing for . His playing positions are scrum-half and wing.

Club rugby  
He usually plays as a scrum-half.

International 
In August 2021 and after great performances with his club Williams was called up to the Springbok squad to replace another Sharks scrumhalf, Jaden Hendrikse, who sustained a leg fracture. He made his international debut off the bench in a 12-13 loss for the Springboks against Wales in Bloemfontein on 9 July 2022.

References

External links
 

South African rugby union players
Living people
1996 births
Cape Coloureds
Rugby union scrum-halves
Sharks (rugby union) players
Sportspeople from Paarl
Sharks (Currie Cup) players
Rugby union players from the Western Cape
Rugby sevens players at the 2014 African Youth Games
South Africa international rugby union players